The Hyde House is a historic house located at 500 S. Court St. in Visalia, California. E. O. Miller, an investor and politician, built the house in 1886; it was purchased by investor Richard E. Hyde and his family soon afterwards. The house was mainly designed in the Queen Anne style. Its design features a half-timbered front gable end, scaled and irregular shingles, and a porch with a Chinese Chippendale railing.

The house was added to the National Register of Historic Places on April 26, 1979.

References

External links

Houses on the National Register of Historic Places in California
Queen Anne architecture in California
Houses completed in 1886
Houses in Tulare County, California
Buildings and structures in Visalia, California
National Register of Historic Places in Tulare County, California